Twin Falls is the county seat and largest city of Twin Falls County, Idaho, United States. The city had a population of 51,807 as of the 2020 census. Located on a broad plain at the south rim of the Snake River Canyon, Twin Falls, is where daredevil Evel Knievel attempted to jump across the canyon in 1974 on a steam-powered rocket. The jump site is northeast of central Twin Falls, midway between Shoshone Falls and the Perrine Bridge.

History
Excavations at Wilson Butte Cave near Twin Falls in 1959 revealed evidence of human activity, including arrowheads, that rank among the oldest dated artifacts in North America. Later Native American tribes predominant in the area included the Northern Shoshone and Bannock.

The first people of European ancestry to visit the Twin Falls area are believed to be members of a group led by American Wilson Price Hunt, who attempted to blaze an all-water trail westward from St. Louis, Missouri, to Astoria, Oregon, in 1811 and 1812. Hunt's expedition met with disaster; much of his expedition was destroyed and one man was killed in rapids on the Snake River known as Caldron Linn near present-day Murtaugh. Hunt and the surviving members of his expedition completed the journey to Astoria by land.

In 1812 and 1813, Robert Stuart successfully led an overland expedition eastward from Astoria to St. Louis, which passed through the Twin Falls area. Stuart's route formed the basis of what became the Oregon Trail. Some 150 years later, Robert Stuart Middle School in Twin Falls was named in his honor.

The first permanent settlement in the area was a stage stop established in 1864 at Rock Creek near the present-day townsite. By 1890, a handful of successful agricultural operations were in the Snake River Canyon, but the lack of infrastructure and the canyon's geography made irrigating the dry surrounding area improbable at best.

To address this issue in 1900, I. B. Perrine founded the Twin Falls Land and Water Company, largely to build an irrigation canal system for the area. Several lots in the surveyed area were set aside specifically for future townsites. These lots eventually became the settlements of Twin Falls, Kimberly, Buhl, Filer, Hansen, and Murtaugh. In 1902, the project nearly failed, as most of the original investors pulled out, with only Salt Lake City businessman Stanley Milner maintaining a stake in the company.

By 1903, Perrine, who had been a successful farmer and rancher in the Snake River Canyon, had obtained private financing from Milner and others under the provisions of the Carey Act of 1894 to build a dam on the Snake River near Caldron Linn. Completed in 1905, Milner Dam and its accompanying canals made commercial irrigation outside the Snake River Canyon practical for the first time. As a result, Perrine is generally credited as the founder of Twin Falls.

A land drawing was held for the future townsite in July 1903, with disappointing results. A much more successful drawing was held in October 1904. Twin Falls city was founded in 1904 as a planned community, designed by celebrated Franco-American architect Emmanuel Louis Masqueray, with proceeds from sales of townsite lots going toward construction of irrigation canals. Twin Falls was incorporated as a village on April 12, 1905. The city is named for a nearby waterfall on the Snake River of the same name. In 1907, Twin Falls became the seat of the newly formed Twin Falls County.

The original townsite follows a unique design. It is laid out on northeast-to-southwest and northwest-to-southeast roads. The purportrd reason this was done was to allow sunlight to come into every room in the homes at some point during the day. The northwest-to-southeast roads were numbered and called avenues, while the northeast-to-southwest roads were numbered and called streets. Only two central streets, the northwest-to-southeast Main Avenue and the northeast-to-southwest Shoshone Street, were named. This system created situations where one side of a street may have an entirely different address from the other, and where the corner of "3rd and 3rd", for example, occurred in more than one location. In 2003, the numbered northeast-to-southwest streets were renamed to alleviate decades of confusion. Later city roads, such as Blue Lakes Boulevard, Addison Avenue, and Washington Street, are laid out in standard north–south and east–west orientations. Addison Avenue honors Addison T. Smith  a 10-term congressman  from Twin Falls.

After Milner Dam was constructed, agricultural production in south-central Idaho increased substantially. In 1909, the privately owned Twin Falls Land and Water Company was reorganized as the shareholder-owned Twin Falls Canal Company. Twin Falls became a major regional economic center serving the agriculture industry, a role which it has sustained to the present day. The city became a processing center for several agricultural commodities, notably beans and sugar beets. In later years, other food-processing operations augmented the local economy. By 1960, Twin Falls had become one of Idaho's largest cities, though its origins were still within living memory for many.

Twin Falls became the center of national attention  in September 1974, when daredevil Evel Knievel attempted to jump the Snake River Canyon in a specially modified rocket cycle. Watched by millions on closed-circuit television on a Sunday afternoon, the attempt ultimately failed due to high winds and a premature deployment of Knievel's parachute. The launch ramp's foundation lies on private land on the canyon's south rim. Less than 2 miles west (3 km) of Shoshone Falls, it is still visible.

During the last quarter of the 20th century, gradual diversification of the agriculture-based economy allowed the city to continue to grow. Major Twin Falls employers in 2006 included computer maker Dell, Inc., Glanbia, and Jayco, a recreational vehicle manufacturer. In September 2009, Dell announced it would close its Twin Falls facility by January 2010. Later in 2010, the call center company C3 opened a facility in the former Dell location.

In recent years, Twin Falls has become quite multicultural. Due in large part to a refugee center operated by the College of Southern Idaho since 1995, significant numbers of people from Bosnia and Herzegovina and the former Soviet Union have settled in Twin Falls. The city also has a sizable Hispanic population.

Government
Twin Falls is one of only three Idaho cities that has a council-manager form of government. The seven-member Twin Falls city council is directly elected in nonpartisan municipal elections to four-year terms. The mayor, who holds little executive power, is periodically selected among current city council members to chair meetings, and is "considered the official representative of the city." City council meetings are usually held on Mondays.

The city's day-to-day operations are overseen by a city manager, who is appointed by the city council. The city government through various citizen boards oversees parks and recreation, planning and zoning, sanitation and garbage collection, street maintenance, and wastewater collection, and maintains police and fire departments. Twin Falls Public Library, Twin Falls Municipal Golf Course and Joslin Field-Magic Valley Regional Airport are also under the city's jurisdiction.

Higher education
Twin Falls is home to the College of Southern Idaho (CSI), a large community college in the northwestern part of the city. The three state universities (Boise State University, Idaho State University, and the University of Idaho) offer classes on the CSI campus. The nursing program received money from the 2007-2008 state budget to construct a state-of-the-art nursing facility to complement the nursing program. The CSI men's basketball team won its third NJCAA Division I Championship in March 2011.

Primary and secondary schools
 
Public schools are administered by the Twin Falls School District, including Twin Falls High School, Canyon Ridge High School, the alternative Magic Valley High School, three middle schools, and nine elementary schools.   Also, Twin Falls is home to Xavier Charter School and the district was awarded best title 1C district in the state.
 
On March 14, 2006, registered voters approved a bond to build an additional high school. A citywide contest was held to determine the school's nickname. In November 2006, the Twin Falls school board selected "River Hawks", thus officially starting the Canyon Ridge High School River Hawks. Also on the bond, were plans to make general improvements to existing school facilities and to convert the junior high schools to middle schools. These projects were completed for the 2009–10 school year. The addition of Canyon Ridge High School meant that the student population was split nearly in half. Athletics for both schools are designated 4A rather than 5A by Idaho High School Activities Association

Elementary schools
 Bickel Elementary School (K-5) 
 Harrison Developmental Preschool
 Harrison Elementary School (K-5)
 I.B. Perrine Elementary School (preschool and K-5) 
 Lincoln Elementary School (K-5) 
 Morningside Elementary School (K-5) 
 Oregon Trail Elementary School (K-5)
 Pillar Falls Elementary School (K-5)
 Sawtooth Elementary School (K-5)
 Rock Creek Elementary School  (K-5)

Middle schools
 
 O'Leary Middle School (6-8)
 Robert Stuart Middle School (6-8)
 Bridge Academy (Alternative 6-8)
 South Hills Middle School (6-8)

High schools
 Canyon Ridge High School (9-12)
 Twin Falls High School (9-12)

Alternative high schools
 Magic Valley High School (9-12)
 
Private schools include Lighthouse Christian School, Xavier Charter School, St. Edward's Catholic School, and Twin Falls Christian Academy.

Economy

Twin Falls, the state's seventh-largest city, is the fastest growing city in south-central Idaho. As of April 2011, unemployment in Twin Falls County stood at 9.5%, below Idaho's average of 9.6%. From 1998 to 2007, the unemployment rate was steadily decreasing, to a low of just under 2%. Then, in tandem with the national economy, the unemployment rate increased to nearly 9.5% as of April 2011.

Twin Falls is the home of cheese producer Glanbia Foods, a major American division of Irish food company Glanbia plc.

Falls Brand, another award-winning food company, is located in the southern part of Twin Falls. In early 2011, Falls Brands' Old Fashioned Basque Chorizo sausage won the "Hold the Mustard" award presented by the National Meat Association (NMA) every year during their annual NMA Annual Gourmet Sausagefest.

Another mainstay is the College of Southern Idaho (CSI). Boasting a student population of 3,433, this junior college may be an alternative for students not yet ready to attend a four-year university. Many students are from out-of-state and live in CSI's residential halls.

Other large employers include Amalgamated Sugar Company, makers of White Satin sugar; and Lamb Weston, which has a food-processing plant located in west Twin Falls. It employs 500 and its annual revenue is about $100 million.

In spite of a troubled national economy, Twin Falls has seen rapid development since 2006. Many major retail outlets had opened stores in Twin Falls between 2006 and 2011.

In November 2009, a new Walmart Supercenter opened, bringing to the region an estimated 100 additional jobs. In October 2010, C3, a customer call center, opened in the former Dell facility. It was a large boost to an already busy economy, providing close to 1,000 jobs. In July 2011, C3 announced it was filling another 300 C3 jobs in Twin Falls due to brisk business.

Creating 40-50 new jobs, Magic Valley Cinema 13 constructed a new theater equipped with D-BAG seating. The new entertainment center was developed in association with the unprecedented growth in the Magic Valley.

In response to a growing population base, Twin Falls County voters voted to construct a new hospital in the northwest section of Twin Falls to replace the city's existing hospital. In spring 2011, the new 700,000-sq-ft facility, St. Luke's Magic Valley, was opened. One of the features of the new hospital is that all 186 rooms are private with family accommodations.

Twin Falls hosted the 2012 Idaho Republican Party convention, which was expected to create more positive economic activity.

China Mountain Wind, LLC in 2011 had proposed to construct a  wind farm after the environmental impact is weighed. Twin Falls County was expected to generate $33.4 million in tax revenues. Local schools and services were receive a portion of the tax revenue. The construction of the wind farm was to bring to the area 400-750 full- and part-time jobs during construction and 24-46 new jobs to maintain the facility.

Chobani Yogurt Company, in 2012, opened the world's largest yogurt manufacturing plant, providing an additional 300 jobs to the Twin Falls community.

Media
The Times-News is a local daily morning newspaper based in Twin Falls.

Over-the-air television stations include:
 KMVT (CBS)
 KSVT-LD (CW) (digital substation)
 KTID (MyNetworkTV and Mexicanal) (digital substation)
 KIPT (PBS)
 KXTF (TCT)
 KTFT (NBC, semi-satellite of KTVB, Boise)
 KSAW-LD (ABC, semi-satellite of KIVI-TV, Boise)
 KYTL

Cable television subscribers also receive stations from Boise and Salt Lake City, Utah.

A number of radio stations broadcast in the Twin Falls area, including:
 88.1 KTFY - The Bridge (Christian Worship Music)
 88.9 KEFX - The Effect Radio Network (Modern Christian rock with over 60 stations nationwide)
 89.9 KAWZ - CSN International (Biblical teaching with over 400 stations nationwide)
 92.7 KTPZ - The Music Monster (Top 40)
 95.7 KEZJ - Idaho Country (Country)
 96.5 KLIX-FM - Kool Oldies (Oldies)
 98.3 KSNQ - The Snake (Classic Rock)
 99.1 KXTA - La Perrona (Regional Mexican)
 99.9 KZDX - Hot 100 FM (Adult contemporary/Top 40)
 102.1 KIRQ - IRock (Modern rock)
 103.1 KEDJ - The Edge (Rock)
 103.7 KSKI (Modern rock)
 103.9 KDKI-LP - (Adult standards/Big band/Jazz)
 104.7 KIKX (Adult hits)
 106.1 KKMV - Kat Kountry (Country)
 106.7 KYUN - Canyon Country (Country)
 970 KFTA - Juan 970 (Regional Mexican)
 1310 KLIX - News and Talk

Transportation
Twin Falls is the largest city in Idaho that is not directly on the Interstate Highway System; it is served by several major highways, including U.S. Route 30 and U.S. Route 93. State Highway 74 provides direct access from downtown Twin Falls to southbound locations on U.S. 93, including Hollister and Rogerson, then crosses into Nevada at Jackpot and continues to a junction with Interstate 80 at Wells.

Trans IV, a small public transportation system operated by CSI, is also available.

Limited commercial air service is provided at Magic Valley Regional Airport, also known as Joslin Field. As of August 2017, daily flights to Salt Lake City are available from Delta Connection (fulfilled by SkyWest Airlines) using the Canadair CRJ200. Twice-weekly service to Las Vegas  was previously operated by Allegiant Air, but the airline discontinued the route in January 2012, citing insufficient ticket prices.

Geography

Twin Falls is located at 42°34'N 114°28'W (42.561,-114.464).

The Snake River Canyon forms the city's northern limits, separating it from Jerome County. Three waterfalls are in the immediate area.

The Perrine Bridge, which spans the Snake River Canyon immediately north of the city, is one of only a handful of artificial structures worldwide where BASE jumping is legal. In September 2005, Miles Daisher of Twin Falls set a BASE-jumping world record by jumping off Perrine Bridge 57 times in a 24-hour period. In July 2006, Dan Schilling jumped off the bridge 201 times in 21 hours to raise money for charity. Unlike Daisher, Schilling was hoisted to the top of the bridge by a crane after every jump.

Climate
Twin Falls experiences a semiarid climate (Köppen climate classification BSk).

Highs reach  on average 18.8 days per year, but very rarely exceed . In Twin Falls proper, an average snowfall uncommonly exceeds 6 inches of snow. Fast moving, intense electrical storms common in the deserts of the southwestern U.S. are uncommon here.

Demographics

2010 census
As of the census of 2010,  44,125 people, 16,744 households, and 11,011 families residing in the city. The racial makeup of the city was 88.5% White, 0.7% African American, 0.8% Native American, 1.8% Asian, 0.1% Pacific Islander, 5.7% from other races, and 2.6% from two or more races. Hispanics or Latinos of any race were 13.1% of the population.

Of the 16,744 households, 35.1% had children under 18 living with them, 48.3% were married couples living together, 12.2% had a female householder with no husband present, 5.2% had a male householder with no wife present, and 34.2% were not families. About 26.6% of all households were made up of individuals, and 10.9% had someone living alone who was 65 or older. The average household size was 2.58. and the average family size was 3.13.

The median age in the city was 31.9 years; 27% of residents were under 18; 11.7% were between 18 and 24; 26.5% were from 25 to 44; 21.4% were from 45 to 64; and 13.4% were 65 or older. The gender makeup of the city was 48.7% male and 51.3% female.

Rankings
On the Livability.com list of "Best 10 Places to Defy Death", Twin Falls ranked number one.

Notable people

 Bruce Bastian (born 1948), computer programmer and co-founder of the WordPerfect Software Company
 Gary L. Bennett (born 1940), former NASA scientist and engineer and science-fiction writer
 Jim Boatwright (1951–2013), basketball player
 Dorothy Custer (1911–2015), comedian, harmonicist, and centenarian
 W. Mark Felt (1913–2008), informant in the Watergate scandal known as Deep Throat, graduated from Twin Falls High School in 1931
 Christina Hendricks (born 1975), actress, grew up in Twin Falls
 Damon Jones (born 1994), professional baseball pitcher
 Chuck LaMar (born c. 1956), first general manager of the Tampa Bay Devil Rays
 William J. Lanting (1918–1998), Idaho State Representative (1959–1975) and Speaker of Idaho House (1969–1975)
 Craig Hart Neilsen (1941–2006), founder of the Craig H. Neilsen Foundation to fund scientific research for spinal cord injuries
 Volara Romanza Nelson (1892–1921), first Idaho woman to hold a pilot's license
 Melvin Schwartz (1932–2006), Nobel Prize-winning experimental physicist and co-discoverer of the muon neutrino
 Addison T. Smith (1862–1956), U.S. Congressman (1913–1933)
 Lyda Southard (1892–1958), serial killer

Notable musicians who spent parts of their childhood in the Twin Falls area include Gary Puckett, Paul Durham of Black Lab, Nikki Sixx of Mötley Crüe, and Doug Martsch of Built to Spill.

References

External links

 City of Twin Falls
Top 10 Things to Do in Twin Falls 
 Twin Falls Area Chamber of Commerce
 Twin Falls Idaho Community Site

 
Cities in Idaho
Cities in Twin Falls County, Idaho
County seats in Idaho
Planned cities in the United States
Populated places established in 1904
Twin Falls, Idaho metropolitan area